Twin Jet is a French regional airline based in Aix en Provence.

History
Twin Jet was founded in May 2001 and operated its first scheduled flight in March 2002.  The company operates 250 flights a week mainly on domestic routes within France as well as to Milan, Italy, Stuttgart, Germany and Zurich, Switzerland as its only foreign destinations.  Its activity is complemented by business aviation and charter flights.

In early January 2017, Twin Jet merged with French competitor Hex'Air and integrated its routes and aircraft.

Destinations
As of March 2023, Twin Jet serves the following destinations:

France

Le Puy-en-Velay – Le Puy – Loudes Airport base
Bus connection for Mende
Lille – Lille Airport
Lyon – Lyon–Saint Exupéry Airport base
Marseille – Marseille Provence Airport base
Mende – Mende-Brenoux Airport
Metz/Nancy – Metz-Nancy-Lorraine Airport base
Paris – Orly Airport
Toulouse – Toulouse-Blagnac Airport base

Germany
Stuttgart – Stuttgart Airport

Italy
Milan – Malpensa Airport
Bologna - Bologna Airport

Fleet

As of June 2022, the Twin Jet fleet consisted of the following aircraft:

Maintenance 
Maintenance is overseen by Kerozen Industrie.

References

External links

Airlines established in 2001
Airlines of France
Aix-en-Provence
French companies established in 2001